Cacochloris uvidula is a moth of the family Geometridae first described by Swinhoe in 1885. It is found in India and probably in Sri Lanka.

References

Moths of Asia
Moths described in 1885